Steel City Jug Slammers are an American jug band from Birmingham, Alabama.  Active members include Ramblin' Ricky Tate, Jerrod Atkins, Corey Medders, Steven Bate, & Jacob Mathews.

History
Founded in 2012.

Steel City Jug Slammers released their Self- titled debut album in 2014.

The band's second album "Tall Tales" was released in 2018.

"Hot Butter" the band's third studio album was released in fall of 2019.

Performance
The Jug Slammers have been featured on the National Jug Band Jubilee. The band also won the 2015 Minneapolis Battle of the Jug Bands.

Radio and Television
The band has been featured on Animal Planet's Pit Bulls & Parolees and NPR's A Prairie Home Companion. The band was also featured by Jerry Springer on his podcast.

Film
Steel City Jug Slammers have appeared in documentary films including Jug Band Hokum and If You Don't Love It Change it.

Discography
Save My Soul (Demo)
Self- Titled (Full length)
The Earnest Tube Sessions (Compilation)
Live at the Uptown Ramblers Club (Live album) 
The Earnest Tube Sessions Vol. 2 (Compilation) Tall Tales (Full Length)

References

Jug bands
Musical groups established in 2012
Musical groups from Birmingham, Alabama
American street performers
2012 establishments in Alabama